Mount Merbuk is a  volcano in Bali, Indonesia.

See also
 List of volcanoes in Indonesia

References

External links

Volcanoes of Bali
Mountains of Bali